Eva Hašková (born 4 January 1946) is a Czech printmaker and illustrator.

A native of Kladno, Hašková graduated from the Academy of Arts, Architecture and Design in Prague, where she had studied under Zdeněk Sklenář, in 1974. Much of her work is created using an intaglio process combining etching and aquatint. A member of SČUG Hollar, she has received numerous prizes for her work during her career, and has exhibited extensively both in the Czech Republic and abroad.

One work by Hašková, the etching, and aquatint Vzpomínka na Karla Capka/Memory of Karel Capek of 1990, is owned by the National Gallery of Art.

References

1946 births
Living people
Czech printmakers
Women printmakers
Czech illustrators
Czech women illustrators
20th-century Czech artists
20th-century Czech printmakers
20th-century Czech women artists
21st-century Czech artists
21st-century printmakers
21st-century Czech women artists
People from Kladno
Academy of Arts, Architecture and Design in Prague alumni